was a Japanese pianist and composer of the Meiji era.

Taki was born in Tokyo, but moved to many places during his childhood owing to his father's job. He graduated from the Tokyo Music School in 1901. One of his famous pieces is "Kōjō no Tsuki" (Moon Over the Ruined Castle), which was included in the songbook for junior high school students, along with the "Hakone-Hachiri" (箱根八里). "Hana" (花, "Flower") is also a well-known song.

In the same year, Taki went to the Leipzig Conservatory in Germany for further studies, but fell seriously ill with pulmonary tuberculosis and therefore returned to Japan. He lived quietly in the country afterwards, but soon died at the age of 23. His posthumous work is a solo piano piece called "Urami" (憾, "Regret"), which he wrote four months before he died.

Recordings
"Kōjō no Tsuki" performed by Jean-Pierre Rampal and Ensemble Lunaire,  Japanese Folk Melodies. transcribed by Akio Yashiro, CBS Records, 1978.
"Kōjō no Tsuki" performed by New Kyoto Ensemble, Distant Winds: The Music of Japan. Intersound, 1992. (no composers are credited on this album)

References

External links
 – Kojo no Tsuki
 – Kojo no Tsuki
 – Urami (regret)

1879 births
1903 deaths
19th-century classical composers
19th-century classical pianists
19th-century Japanese composers
19th-century Japanese male musicians
20th-century classical composers
20th-century classical pianists
20th-century deaths from tuberculosis
20th-century Japanese composers
20th-century Japanese male musicians
Japanese classical composers
Japanese classical pianists
Japanese male classical composers
Japanese male classical pianists
Japanese Romantic composers
Musicians from Tokyo
Tokyo Music School alumni
Tuberculosis deaths in Japan